The Boeing T-5 or Thorp T-5 was a student-built aircraft that was designed by John Thorp for the Boeing School of Aeronautics.

Design and development
The T-5 was an all-metal, side-by-side configuration, low-wing, conventional landing gear-equipped aircraft. The prototype was test flown in 1939 by Eddie Allen.

Variants

T-5
Taildragger prototype
T-6
Tricycle gear conversion of the T-5 with a Lycoming engine.

Specifications (T-5)

References

External links

Single-engined tractor aircraft
Trainer aircraft